Sidney James Smith (July 11, 1925 – April 29, 2004) was a National Hockey League left winger who played with the Toronto Maple Leafs for 12 seasons. He was the Leafs team captain from 1955 to 1956.

Playing career
Born in Toronto, Ontario, and attended De La Salle College, Smith began his career in minor leagues in Toronto and later with the Oshawa Generals in the Ontario Hockey League. He attended Essex School and resided at 1 Burnfield Avenue in Seaton. 

Having played 45 games in two championship seasons for the Maple Leafs, he spent most of the 1948–49 season in the AHL with the Pittsburgh Hornets before he was called back to Toronto. After playing just one regular season game Smith scored a hat-trick in Game 2 on the Stanley Cup finals to help Toronto to a four-games sweep of the Detroit Red Wings. Smith had six consecutive seasons with 20 or more goals, a distinction held by the great Gordie Howe. Smith retired in the 1957–1958 season and later became a player-coach with the Whitby Dunlops, a senior team in the Ontario Hockey Association in 1957. Smith played 601 regular season games scoring 186 goals and 183 assists for 369 points. In 44 play-off games, he scored 17 goals and 10 assists for 27 points.

Awards and achievements
 Three Stanley Cup championships 1947–48, 1948–49, 1950–51
 Two Lady Byng Trophies in 1951–52 and 1954–55.
 Selected for the second All-Star team in 1950–51 and 1951–52, and for the first All-Star team in 1954–55

Career statistics

References

External links
 

1925 births
2004 deaths
Canada men's national ice hockey team coaches
Canadian ice hockey left wingers
Lady Byng Memorial Trophy winners
Oshawa Generals players
Pittsburgh Hornets players
Place of death missing
Ice hockey people from Toronto
Stanley Cup champions
Toronto Maple Leafs players